Bosisio is an Italian surname. Notable people with the surname include:

Franco Bosisio (born 1960), known as Franko B, Italian performance artist
Gabriele Bosisio (born 1980), Italian cyclist
Liù Bosisio (born 1936), Italian actress and playwright
Lorenzo Bosisio (born 1944), Italian cyclist
Renato Giuseppe Bosisio (1930–2019), Canadian engineer and academic.

See also
Bosisio Parini, comune in Lombardy, Italy

Italian-language surnames